The Prince and the Evening Star (Czech:Princ a Večernice) is a 1979 Czechoslovak fairy tale film.

Plot
Old King has a son Velen and three daughters. One day he leaves Velen to temporarily run the kingdom. One night, Velen wishes upon the Evening Star, hoping to find husbands for his three sisters, and Evening Star delivers her three brothers, Moonbeam, Sunbeam and Wind. Meanwhile, Velen falls in love with the Evening Star. King is dissatisfied with Velen's actions and wants Velen to bring his sisters back. They quarrel, and Velen leaves the castle on a quest to retrieve his sisters, as well as find the object of his affection, Evening Star. He has to face many dangers on his quest, including being endangered by the evil wizard Cloudbreaker (a personification of storm) who wants to marry Evening Star. Velen is helped by his brothers in law and defeats Cloudbreaker. He then returns home with Evening Star and his sisters, accompanied by their husbands. Velen is allowed to marry Evening Star.

Cast
 Juraj Ďurdiak as Velen
 Libuše Šafránková as Evening Star
 Vladimír Menšík as the King
 Radoslav Brzobohatý as Cloudbreaker
 František Filipovský as Kacafírek
 Julie Jurištová as Helenka
 Zlata Adamovská as Elenka
 Ivana Andrlová as Lenka
 Oldřich Táborský as Wind
 Alexej Okuněv as Moonbeam
 Petr Svoboda as Sunbeam

References

External links
 

1979 films
1970s fantasy adventure films
1970s children's films
Czech children's films
Czech fantasy adventure films
Czechoslovak fantasy films
1970s Czech-language films
Films about princes
Films based on fairy tales
Films directed by Václav Vorlíček
Films with screenplays by Jiří Brdečka
Films based on works by Božena Němcová